Norlund, Nørlund or Nõrlund may refer to:
Niels Erik Nørlund (1885–1980), Danish mathematician
Nørlund–Rice integral
Nõrlund mean
Alex Nørlund, Danish football player
Louise Nørlund (1854–1919), Danish feminist
Poul Nørlund (1888-1951), Danish historian and archaeologist 

Places
Norlund Alps, Greenland
Norlund Land, Greenland
Norlund Slot (Nørlund castle) in Funen